Michael Russell Laga (born June 14, 1960) is a former professional baseball player for the Detroit Tigers, St. Louis Cardinals and San Francisco Giants in the 1980s and 1990s.  He is best known for once hitting a foul ball out of the second Busch Stadium (September 15, 1986).
 
Laga played for the 1984 World Series Champion Detroit Tigers, going 6–11 that year with a .545 average for the year, but did not appear in the World Series. Nor did he appear in the 1987 World Series for the St. Louis Cardinals. In his career, Laga played in 188 major league games and had 84 hits, 55 RBIs, 39 runs scored, and 16 home runs.

Laga currently lives in Florence, Massachusetts. He has three  children.

Laga graduated from Ramsey High School in Ramsey, New Jersey and attended Bergen Community College.

References

External links

Detroit Tigers players
St. Louis Cardinals players
Fukuoka Daiei Hawks players
American expatriate baseball players in Japan
Bergen Community College alumni
Major League Baseball first basemen
Nashville Sounds players
Lakeland Tigers players
Evansville Triplets players
Louisville Redbirds players
Phoenix Firebirds players
Birmingham Barons players
Baseball players from New Jersey
People from Ramsey, New Jersey
People from Ridgewood, New Jersey
Ramsey High School (New Jersey) alumni
San Francisco Giants players
Sportspeople from Bergen County, New Jersey
1960 births
Living people